The Diplomats, also popularly known as Dipset, are a Harlem-based hip hop group founded by Cam'ron and Jim Jones in 1997. discography consists of three studio albums, 6 singles, and one soundtrack on Diplomat Records. Music videos are also included, however, solo works from the groups' members, Cam'Ron, Jim Jones, Juelz Santana, Freekey Zekey, JR Writer, Hell Rell, & 40 Cal, Stack Bundles (deceased), Katt Williams and Max B are not included.

The first commercial appearance of the group was on Cam'ron's 2000 album S.D.E., released on Epic Records. During this period, various members of the original group consisting of Cam'ron, Jim Jones, and others, were first signed together as a group to Roc-A-Fella Records from 2002 to 2004, though they are now signed to their own label, Diplomat Records. Each individual artist, however is signed to a different label, including E1 Music, Asylum, and Def Jam, among others.

The group came to further popularity in 2002 with the release of Cam'ron's third album, Come Home With Me. The lead singles were platinum hits "Oh Boy" and "Hey Ma", which both featured group mate Juelz Santana. The group followed Cam'ron's solo album shortly after with their debut album Diplomatic Immunity released in 2003, which featured remixes of both songs, as well as lead single "Dipset Anthem" which peaked at #64 on the Billboard Hot R&B/Hip-Hop Songs chart. The double-disc album was a success and quickly became certified gold by RIAA under two months after its release. By the time of the release of their 2004 follow-up, Diplomatic Immunity 2, additional members Hell Rell, 40 Cal., and J. R. Writer had joined the group.

Albums

Studio albums

Compilation albums

Mixtapes

Singles

As lead artist

See also
Cam'ron discography
Jim Jones discography
Juelz Santana discography

References

Discography
Discographies of American artists
Hip hop discographies